The 2021 USL League Two Playoffs was the post-season championship for the 2021 USL League Two season. It is the twenty-sixth edition of the Playoffs and the second under the USL League Two banner. The playoffs began on July 16 and ended with the USL League Two Final on July 31.

There were no playoffs the previous season due to the COVID-19 pandemic.

The Des Moines Menace won their third straight Regular Season Title (2018, 2019, 2021), with an average of 2.75 standings points per game.

The Menace defeated North Carolina Fusion U23 in the National Final 1–0 before a record crowd of 7,342.

Qualifying Teams

Eastern Conference 
Northeast Division
Western Mass Pioneers - Division Winner
Boston Bolts - Division Runner-up
Seacoast United Phantoms - Conference Wild Card (Best 3rd place record between the Mid Atlantic and Northeast Divisions)

Mid Atlantic Division
West Chester United SC - Division Winner
Ocean City Nor'easters - Division Runner-up

Metropolitan Division
Long Island Rough Riders - Division Winner
Cedar Stars Rush - Division Runner-up
New York Red Bulls U-23 - Division 3rd Place

Southern Conference 
South Atlantic Division
North Carolina Fusion U23 - Division Winner
Lionsbridge FC - Division Runner-up
West Virginia United - Division 3rd Place

Deep South Division
SC United Bantams - Division Winner
Tormenta FC 2 - Division Runner-up
East Atlanta FC - Division 3rd Place

Southeast Division
The Villages SC - Division Winner
Tampa Bay United - Division Runner-up

Central Conference 
Great Lakes Division
Kalamazoo FC - Division Winner
Flint City Bucks - Division Runner-up
Kings Hammer FC - Division 3rd Place

Heartland Division
Des Moines Menace - Division Winner
Chicago FC United - Division Runner-up

Mid South Division
Mississippi Brilla FC - Division Winner
Corpus Christi FC - Division Runner-up
Texas United - Division 3rd Place

Western Conference 
Mountain Division
Park City Red Wolves - Division Winner

Northwest Division
Portland Timbers U23s - Division Winner

Southwest Division
 Teams did not participate in the 2021 season due to COVID-19 concerns.

Bracket

Conference Playoffs

Eastern Conference Championship

Southern Conference Championship

Central Conference Championship

Western Conference Championship

USL League Two Championship

Semifinals

Final 

Championship MVP: Manel Busquets (DMM)

References

External links
 USL League Two website

2021
2021 in American soccer leagues